

England

Head coach: Peter Colston

 Bill Beaumont
 Neil Bennett
 Tony Bond
 Richard Cardus
 Robin Cowling
 Paul Dodge
 Alastair Hignell
 Nigel Horton
 Peter Kingston
 Tony Neary
 Gary Pearce
 Mike Rafter
 John Scott
 Mike Slemen
 Colin Smart
 Peter Squires
 Roger Uttley (c.)
 Peter Wheeler
 Malcolm Young

France

Head coach: Jean Desclaux

 Roger Aguerre
 Jean-Michel Aguirre
 Christian Belascain
 Roland Bertranne
 Louis Bilbao
 Alain Caussade
 Gérard Cholley
 Frédéric Costes
 Jérôme Gallion
 Jean-François Gourdon
 Alain Guilbert
 Francis Haget
 Jean-François Imbernon
 Jean-Luc Joinel
 Alain Maleig
 Yves Malquier
 Jean-François Marchal
 Guy Noves
 Alain Paco
 Robert Paparemborde
 Jean-Pierre Rives (c.)
 Armand Vaquerin

Ireland

Head coach: Noel Murphy

 Willie Duggan
 Ron Elliott
 Moss Finn
 Michael Gibson
 Moss Keane
 Terry Kennedy
 Freddie McLennan
 Ginger McLoughlin
 Paul McNaughton
 Alistair McKibbin
 Phil Orr
 Colin Patterson
 Fergus Slattery (c.)
 Dick Spring
 Harold Steele
 Colm Tucker
 Tony Ward
 Pa Whelan

Scotland

Head coach: Nairn McEwan

 Mike Biggar
 Bob Cunningham
 Colin Deans
 Gordon Dickson
 David Gray
 Bruce Hay
 Andy Irvine
 Iain Lambie
 Alan Lawson
 Ian McLauchlan
 Ian McGeechan (c.)
 Alastair McHarg
 Iain Milne
 Jim Renwick
 Keith Robertson
 John Rutherford
 Alan Tomes
 Bill Watson

Wales

Head coach: John Dawes

 Barry Clegg
 Gareth Davies
 Charlie Faulkner
 Steve Fenwick
 Ray Gravell
 Clive Griffiths
 Terry Holmes
 Allan Martin
 Alan Phillips
 Graham Price
 Derek Quinnell
 Elgan Rees
 David Richards
 Paul Ringer
 Mike Roberts
 Jeff Squire
 J. J. Williams
 J. P. R. Williams (c.)
 Bobby Windsor

External links
1979 Five Nations Championship at ESPN

Six Nations Championship squads